Quinton de Bruin (born 12 August 1975) is a South African cricketer. He played in seven first-class matches for Eastern Province in 1994/95 and 1995/96.

See also
 List of Eastern Province representative cricketers

References

External links
 

1975 births
Living people
South African cricketers
Eastern Province cricketers
Cricketers from Durban